David Bettoni (born 23 November 1971) is a French former professional football player and coach. He is the current manager of FC Sion in the Swiss Super League.

Managerial career
Bettoni first met Zidane when they were both playing for the youth side of Cannes.

Bettoni was invited at Real Madrid to work as a scout in 2013, identifying exciting young talents. Prior to landing in Madrid he was in charge of the system for bringing young players through at Cannes.

Bettoni joined the coaching staff of his friend, when Zidane was appointed as the head coach of Real Madrid Castilla in summer 2014.

Later, Bettoni followed Zidane, when the latter took charge at Real Madrid. However, the club later confirmed that Bettoni wasn't an assistant coach, but a member of the technical team that serves the first team and assists the head coach.

On 23 January 2021, Bettoni managed the team in a 4–1 away win against Alavés after head coach Zinedine Zidane tested positive for COVID-19.

In 2023, Bettoni was named new head coach of Swiss side FC Sion.

References

1971 births
Living people
AS Cannes players
Association football midfielders
Expatriate footballers in Italy
French expatriate footballers
French expatriate sportspeople in Italy
Ligue 1 players
French football managers
French expatriate football managers
French expatriate sportspeople in Spain
Expatriate football managers in Spain
French footballers